Thoen is a surname. It is a Norwegian name from the Old Norse Tónni. It is a Dutch variant of the name Anton and Antonius.

 Ernest Thoen (1946 - 2011), American photographer
 Fridtjof Thoen (born 1961), Norwegian judoka
 Terje Thoen (1944 – 2008), Norwegian ice hockey player

See also

Thon (name)
Theon (disambiguation)
Thorn (surname)
Thoe (disambiguation)
Thoen (disambiguation)
Thone (disambiguation)
Thien (disambiguation) 
Thiên (disambiguation)

Notes

Dutch-language surnames
Norwegian-language surnames